Barom Reachea III (1566–1600), also known as Ponhea An, was the Cambodian king ruled briefly in 1599–1600.

He succeeded his nephew Barom Reachea II in 1599. He put down the Cham rebellion, but soon another revolt led by Kêv broke out.

Barom Reachea III still sought Spanish help. He sent an envoy to Manila and sent a message to the governor of Malacca. He was killed in the same year.

References

1566 births
1600 deaths
17th-century Cambodian monarchs